Thomas Lafayette Houchins Jr. (November 2, 1923 in Oakland, California – February 13, 2005 in Castro Valley, California) was sheriff for the Alameda County Sheriff's Office of Alameda County, California from 1975 to 1979. He gained some notoriety as a tough sheriff in his dealings with Berkeley, California protestors in the 1960s. His policing style then, while serving under then-sheriff Frank Madigan, was described as "kick ass and take names" by Sheriff Charles Plummer (who was a field commander for the Berkeley Police Department when riots erupted in People's Park in 1969).

External links 
'Tough' veteran county sheriff dies at age 81, by Matt O'Brien, Oakland Tribune,  February 16, 2005

American police chiefs
1923 births
2005 deaths
Alameda County sheriffs
20th-century American politicians
People from Oakland, California